Brazil has competed at every edition of the Pan American Games since the first edition of the multi-sport event in 1951.

Medal count 

To sort the tables by host city, total medal count, or any other column, click on the  icon next to the column title.

Summer

Winter

Medals by summer sport
Brazilians have won medals in most of the current Pan American sports.

Updated after the 2019 Pan American Games

Best results in non-medaling sports:

Medals by individual

This is a list of people who have won eight or more medals for Brazil at the Pan American Games, ranked by total medals earned. The list is pre-sorted by most gold medals, most silver medals and most bronze medals.

References

See also 
Brazil at the Parapan American Games
Brazil at the Olympics
Brazil at the Paralympics
Brazil at the Universiade